Megachile geoffrei is a species of bee in the family Megachilidae. It was described by Theodore Dru Alison Cockerell in 1920.

References

Geoffrei
Insects described in 1920